East Stroudsburg Senior High School North is a midsized, public high school located in Dingmans Ferry in Pike County, Pennsylvania. It is one of two high schools operated by the East Stroudsburg Area School District. 

As of the 2020-21 school year, the school had an enrollment of 948 students, according to National Center for Education Statistics data.

Athletics 

East Stroudsburg North competes athletically in the Eastern Pennsylvania Conference (EPC) in the District XI division of the Pennsylvania Interscholastic Athletic Association, one of the premier high school athletic divisions in the nation. East Stroudsburg North fields teams in the following sports:

Varsity

Boys
Baseball - AAAA
Basketball- AAAA
Cross country - AAA
Football - AAAA
Golf - AAA
Rifle - AAAA
Soccer - AAA
Swimming and diving - AAA
Tennis - AAA
Track and field - AAA
Wrestling - AAA

Girls
Basketball - AAAA
Cheer - AAAA
Cross country - AAA
Field hockey - AAA
Golf - AAA
Rifle - AAAA
Soccer (Fall) - AAA
Softball - AAA
Swimming and diving - AAA
Tennis - AAA
Track and field - AAA
Volleyball - AAA

According to PIAA directory July 2013

Departments and Programs

Music
Since the year 2000, the East Stroudsburg High School North has had a concert choir (open to all students); a select choir; courses in music fundamentals and composition, piano class; and have participated in adjudications and select programs at the regional and state levels.  There is also the concert band, jazz band, color guard, and other instrumental ensembles which are open to students by audition.  Throughout the school year, the vocal music and instrumental music programs host several concerts open to the community.  The music classrooms are located on the first floor of the building.

Science
The Science Department offers courses in general science and biology for all 9th and 10th graders (respectively) at the applied, college prep, and honors levels.  After completing Biology I, students can enroll in courses in environmental science, anatomy and physiology, chemistry, or physics.  Advanced Placement (AP) courses in biology, chemistry, and physics are available for those students who qualify.  Prior to 2005, a second-semester chemistry course and a course in human sexuality were offered in the Science Department.  For several years, a forensics course as well as an earth science course, "General Science II," were offered.

The science labs are housed on the middle wing, on both the first and second floors.

Social Studies
When the school first opened, all students were required to complete three years of social studies courses.  These included World Cultures I, World Cultures/US History II, and US History III.  These courses were offered at the honors, academic (later College Prep) and applied levels.  Additionally, students could enroll in various elective courses offered through the Social Studies Department, including Current World Issues, Psychology, and Sociology.  An Advanced Placement (AP) level course in US History was also offered for those students who qualified.

Beginning with the class of 2008, students are now required to complete four years of social studies courses.  The new course sequence included World Studies I (grade 9), World Studies II (grade 10), American Studies I (grade 11), and American Studies II (grade 12).

As of 2022, ninth grade students are required to complete a course in World Civilizations.  Tenth grade students are required to take a course in Civics.  Eleventh grade students are required to take American History, and twelfth grade students are required to take a course in Global Citizenship.  Courses are offered at the honors, College Prep, and Applied levels.  Additionally, Advanced Placement (AP) courses in US Government (grade 10), US History I (grade 11), and US History II (grade 12) are also offered for those students who qualify.  As electives, students can enroll in “Multicultural Perspectives on US History,” Psychology, Sociology, Current World Issues, and US Government and Politics.

The Social Studies Department is housed on the first floor of the building.

Technology Education
Students at East Stroudsburg High School North can choose between courses in Architectural Drawing, Graphic Technology, Electronics, Wood Technology, TV & Video Production, Energy/Power, and Multimedia.
The Technology Education Department is housed on the first floor of the building.

Musical
East Stroudsburg North stages an annual musical the first week of April.
2001: Godspell
2002: Footloose
2003: Chicago
2004: The Wizard of Oz
2005: Seussical the Musical
2006: Joseph and the Amazing Technicolored Dreamcoat
2007: The Sound of Music
2008: The Music Man
2010: Grease
2012: Once on this Island
2013: Ragtime
2014: Aida
2015: Godspell
2016: Hairspray
2017: In the Heights
2018: Seussical
2019: The Wiz

History

Principals

Notable alumni
Alexis Cohen, American Idol contestant

References

External links
Official website
East Stroudsburg High School North sports coverage at The Express-Times

Public high schools in Pennsylvania
Schools in Pike County, Pennsylvania
2000 establishments in Pennsylvania
Educational institutions established in 2000